A blue-collar worker is a working class person who performs manual labor.  Blue-collar work may involve skilled or unskilled labor. The type of work may involving manufacturing, warehousing, mining, excavation, electricity generation and power plant operations, electrical construction and maintenance, custodial work, farming, commercial fishing, logging, landscaping, pest control, food processing, oil field work, waste collection and disposal, recycling, construction, maintenance, shipping, driving, trucking, and many other types of physical work. Blue-collar work often involves something being physically built or maintained.

In contrast, the white-collar worker typically performs work in an office environment and may involve sitting at a computer or desk. A third type of work is a service worker (pink collar) whose labor is related to customer interaction, entertainment, sales or other service-oriented work. Many occupations blend blue, white, or pink-collar work and are often paid hourly wage-labor, although some professionals may be paid by the project or salaried.  There are a wide range of payscales for such work depending upon field of specialty and experience.

Origin of term

The term blue collar was first used in reference to trades jobs in 1924, in an Alden, Iowa newspaper. The phrase stems from the image of manual workers wearing blue denim or chambray shirts as part of their uniforms. Industrial and manual workers often wear durable canvas or cotton clothing that may be soiled during the course of their work. Navy and light blue colors conceal potential dirt or grease on the worker's clothing, helping them to appear cleaner. For the same reason, blue is a popular color for boilersuits which protect workers' clothing. Some blue collar workers have uniforms with the name of the business and/or the individual's name embroidered or printed on it.

Historically, the popularity of the colour blue among manual labourers contrasts with the popularity of white dress shirts worn by people in office environments. The blue collar/white collar colour scheme has socio-economic class connotations. However, this distinction has become blurred with the increasing importance of skilled labor, and the relative increase in low-paying white-collar jobs.

Educational requirements

Since many blue-collar jobs consist of mainly manual labor, educational requirements for workers are typically lower than those of white-collar workers. Often, not even a high school diploma is required, and many of the skills required for blue-collar jobs are learned by the employee while working. In higher level blue collar jobs, such as becoming an electrician or plumber, vocational training or apprenticeships are required and state-certification is also necessary.
For this reason, it is common to apply the label "blue collar" or "working class" to people without a college education, whether or not they work in a blue-collar job.

Blue collar shift to developing nations

With the information revolution, Western nations have moved towards a service and white-collar economy. Many manufacturing jobs have been offshored to developing nations which pay their workers lower wages. This offshoring has pushed formerly agrarian nations to industrialized economies and concurrently decreased the number of blue-collar jobs in developed countries.

In the U.S., blue collar and service occupations generally refer to jobs in precision production, craft, and repair occupations; machine operators and inspectors; transportation and moving occupations; handlers, equipment cleaners, helpers, and laborers.

In the U.S., an area known as the Rust Belt comprising the Northeast and Midwest, including Western New York and Western Pennsylvania, has seen its once large manufacturing base shrink significantly.  With the de-industrialization of these areas starting in the mid-1960s, cities like Cleveland, Ohio; Detroit, Michigan; Buffalo, New York; Pittsburgh, Pennsylvania; Erie, Pennsylvania; Youngstown, Ohio; Toledo, Ohio; Rochester, New York; and St. Louis, Missouri have experienced a steady decline of the blue-collar workforce and subsequent population decreases. Due to this economic osmosis, the rust belt has experienced high unemployment, poverty, and urban blight.

Automation and future
Due to many blue-collar jobs involving manual labor, automation poses a threat of unemployment for blue-collar workers.  One study from the MIT Technology Review estimates that 83% of jobs that make less than $20 per hour are threatened by automation.  Some examples of technology that threaten workers are self-driving cars and automated cleaning devices, which could place blue-collar workers such as truck drivers or janitors out of work.

Others have suggested that technological advancement will not lead to blue-collar job unemployment, but rather shifts in the types of work performed. Proponents of this idea view coding as a replacement for blue-collar jobs, and suggest that more coders will be needed in a technologically advancing world, and posit that, ostensibly, new white-collar IT jobs could be filled by displaced blue-collar workers. Others see future of blue-collar work as humans and computers working together to improve efficiency.

Adjective

Blue-collar can be used as an adjective to describe the environment of the blue-collar worker or a setting reflective of that environment, such as a "blue-collar" neighborhood, restaurant, or bar.

References

1920s neologisms
Employment classifications
Globalism
Globalization
Working class